The volcano clawed frog (Xenopus amieti) is a species of frog in the family Pipidae endemic to Cameroon.  Its natural habitats are subtropical or tropical high-altitude grassland, swamps, intermittent freshwater lakes, freshwater marshes, pastureland, and aquaculture ponds.  It is threatened by habitat loss.

The skin secretions of the volcano clawed (Xenopus amieti) octoploid frog contain non-toxic insulin-releasing peptides that could be developed into novel anti-diabetic drugs. These secretions are stimulated by injection of norepinephrine bitartrate.

References

Xenopus
Endemic fauna of Cameroon
Amphibians described in 1980
Taxonomy articles created by Polbot
Fauna of the Cameroonian Highlands forests